The Lelystad–Zwolle railway, also known as the Hanzelijn, is a Dutch railway line, finished in 2012. It connects Lelystad, capital of the province of Flevoland, with Zwolle, capital of the neighbouring province of Overijssel, and provides a direct rail link between Flevoland and the north-east of the Netherlands.

Construction
The Hanzelijn project was essentially a less costly alternative to the Zuiderzeelijn (Zuiderzee Line), a proposed new Lelystad-Groningen line via Emmeloord, Heerenveen and Drachten for which planning was cancelled in 2007.

Work started in January 2007 and was completed in December 2012. Two new stations have been built: Dronten and Kampen Zuid. Operator NS is planning to operate their new ICNG trains on the route, which are capable of achieving the higher speeds. Delays in manufacturing have caused their introduction to be no earlier than the second half of 2023, however. 

On 6 December 2012 the railway was opened by Queen Beatrix, using the Dutch Royal Train to traverse the new track. Scheduled services began operating on Sunday, 9 December 2012. The journey from Lelystad to Zwolle takes 25 minutes, reducing journey times from Amsterdam to Zwolle – and further north – by about 15 minutes. The total length of the new track is 50 km.

Infrastructure
This new bridge, known as the Hanzeboog, includes a separate pedestrian and cycle track in addition to the double-tracked railway. It opened on 14 June 2011, replacing a rail-only twin-span vertical-lift drawbridge that had been in place since just after the Second World War.

Journey times
The Hanzelijn has shortened journey times between Zwolle and Amsterdam by at least 10 minutes, and up to 20 minutes for some journeys. Interliner express bus route 330, which connected Lelystad and Zwolle, was discontinued upon opening of the Hanzelijn.

See also
 ZwolleSpoort project

References

External links

 Hanzelijn

Buildings and structures in Flevoland
Buildings and structures in Overijssel
Railway lines in the Netherlands
Railway tunnels in the Netherlands